Honey Promises is a music album by Irish musician Sinéad Madden, featuring her own songs and contributions from Moya Brennan and Cormac de Barra. The album was launched on 5 May 2009 at The Academy in Abbey Street, Dublin.

Track listing
"Someone Else"
"Fade To Black"
"Shadows"
"Impossible Dream"
"Honey Promises"
"Take me"
"Goodbye"
"Temptress"
"Personal Prison"
"Butterfly Girl"
"Will You?"
"Broken Star"

Personnel

2009 albums